Artyom Sergeyevich Arkhipov (born 15 December 1996) is a Russian football player who plays as a striker for Kuban Krasnodar.

Club career
He made his debut in the Russian Professional Football League for FC Tambov on 17 April 2015 in a game against FC Fakel Voronezh.

He made his Russian Premier League debut for FC Tambov on 26 February 2021 in a game against FC Rotor Volgograd. He started the game and scored the opening goal before his team lost 1–3.

On 23 June 2021, he joined Akhmat Grozny on loan for the 2020–21 season.

Personal life
He is a twin brother of Sergei Arkhipov, who is also a professional footballer.

Career statistics

References

External links
 Profile by Russian Professional Football League
 
 

1996 births
Footballers from Tambov
Twin sportspeople
Russian twins
Living people
Russian footballers
Association football forwards
FC Tambov players
FC Saturn Ramenskoye players
FC Gorodeya players
FC Shakhtyor Soligorsk players
FC Urozhay Krasnodar players
FC Akhmat Grozny players
Russian Premier League players
Russian First League players
Russian Second League players
Belarusian Premier League players
Russian expatriate footballers
Expatriate footballers in Belarus
Russian expatriate sportspeople in Belarus